Mike Mentzer (November 15, 1951 – June 10, 2001) was an American IFBB professional bodybuilder, businessman and author.

Early life and education
Mike Mentzer was born on November 15, 1951, in the Germantown section of Philadelphia and was of German descent. In grammar school and Ephrata High School, he received "all A's", He credits his 12th grade teacher, Elizabeth Schaub, for his "love of language, thought, and writing." In 1975, he started attending the University of Maryland as a pre-med student where his hours away from the gym were spent in the study of "genetics, physical chemistry, and organic chemistry." After three years he left the university. He said his ultimate goal during that period was to become a psychiatrist.

Bodybuilding career

Amateur
Mentzer started bodybuilding when he was 12 years old at a body weight of  after seeing the men on the covers of several muscle magazines. His father had bought him a set of weights and an instruction booklet. The booklet suggested that he train no more than three days a week, so Mike did just that. By age 15, his body weight had reached , at which Mike could bench press . Mike's goal at the time was to look like his bodybuilding hero, Bill Pearl. After graduating high school, Mentzer served four years in the United States Air Force. It was during this time he started working out over three hours a day, six days a week.

Mentzer started competing in local physique contests when he was 18 years old and attended his first contest in 1969. In 1971, Mentzer entered and won the Mr. Lancaster contest. In 1971 he suffered his worst defeat, placing 10th at the AAU Mr. America, which was won by Casey Viator. Mentzer considered his presence at this contest important later on, as he met Viator, who gave Mentzer the contact information for his trainer Arthur Jones. Due to a severe shoulder injury, he was forced to quit training from 1971 to 1974. In early 1975, however, he resumed training and returned to competition in 1975 at the Mr. America contest, placing third behind Robby Robinson and Roger Callard. Mentzer went on to win that competition the next year, in 1976. He won the 1977 North America championships in Vancouver, British Columbia, Canada, and competed a week later at the 1977 Mr. Universe in Nîmes, France, placing second to Kal Szkalak. In 1978, Mentzer won the Mr. Universe in Acapulco, Mexico with the first and only perfect 300 score. He became a professional bodybuilder after that 1978 Universe win.

Professional
In late 1979, Mentzer won the heavyweight class of the Mr. Olympia, again with a perfect 300 score, but he lost in the overall to Frank Zane who was awarded the title for a third time that year. In the 1980 Mr. Olympia he placed fourth (in a tie with Boyer Coe) behind Arnold Schwarzenegger, Chris Dickerson and Frank Zane.

Retirement
He retired from competitive bodybuilding after that show at the age of 29. He maintained that the contest was rigged until the day he died.  While he never said he thought that he should have won, he maintained that Arnold should not have, though he eventually got on good terms with Schwarzenegger.

Legacy
In 2002, Mentzer was inducted into the IFBB Hall of Fame. He appears in the music video for the Nantucket's cover of "It's a Long Way to the Top".

Bodybuilding philosophy
Mentzer was an Objectivist and insisted that philosophy and bodybuilding are one and the same. He said "Man is an indivisible entity, an integrated unit of mind and body." Thus, his books contain as much philosophy as they do bodybuilding information.

Mentzer took the bodybuilding concepts developed by Arthur Jones and attempted to perfect them. Through years of study, observation, knowledge of stress physiology, the most up-to-date scientific information available, and careful use of his reasoning abilities, Mentzer devised and successfully implemented his own theory of bodybuilding. Mentzer's theories are intended to help a drug-free person achieve his or her full genetic potential within the shortest amount of time.

High-Intensity Training the Mike Mentzer Way was Mentzer's final work. In it, he detailed the principles of high intensity weight training. Weight training, he insisted, had to be brief, infrequent, and intense, to attain the best results in the shortest amount of time. Heavy Duty II also espouses critical thinking. In this book, Mentzer shows why people need to use their reasoning ability to live happy, mature, adult lives, and he shows readers how to go about doing so. Bodybuilding was endorsed as only one potential component of an individual's existence, encouraging many other worthwhile pursuits throughout his books.

Diet and nutrition
Diet has always been as important, if not more, than weight-training for bodybuilders. However, in his book Heavy Duty Nutrition, Mentzer demonstrated that nutrition for athletes did not need to be nearly as extreme as the bodybuilding industry would lead one to believe. His recommended diets were well balanced, and he espoused eating from all four food groups, totaling four servings each of high-quality grains and fruits, and two each of dairy and protein daily, all year-round.

Mentzer believed that carbohydrates should make up the bulk of the caloric intake, 50–60%, rather than protein as others preferred. Mentzer's reasoning was simple: to build 10 pounds of muscle in a year, a total of 6000 extra calories needed to be ingested throughout the year, because one pound of muscle contains 600 calories. That averages 16 extra calories per day, and only four of them needed to be from protein—because muscle is 22% protein, about one quarter.

Mentzer's heavy-duty training system
While Mike Mentzer served in the US Air Force, he worked 12-hour shifts, and then followed that up with 'marathon workouts' as was the accepted standard in those days. In his first bodybuilding contest, he met the winner, Casey Viator. Mentzer learned that Viator trained in very high intensity (heavy weights for as many repetitions as possible, to total muscle fatigue), for very brief (20–45 minutes per session) and infrequent training sessions. Mentzer also learned that Viator almost exclusively worked out with the relatively new Nautilus machines, created and marketed by Arthur Jones in DeLand, Florida. Mentzer and Jones soon met and became friends.

Jones pioneered the principles of high-intensity training in the late 1960s. He emphasized the need to maintain perfectly strict form, move the weights in a slow and controlled manner, work the muscles to complete failure (positive and negative), and avoid overtraining. Casey Viator saw fantastic results training under the direction of Jones, and Mentzer became very interested in this training philosophy. Eventually, however, Mentzer concluded that even Jones was not completely applying his own principles, so Mentzer began investigating a more full application of them. He began training clients in a near-experimental manner, evaluating the perfect number of repetitions, exercises, and days of rest to achieve maximum benefits.

For more than ten years, Mentzer's Heavy Duty program involved 7–9 sets per workout on a three-day-per-week schedule. With the advent of "modern bodybuilding" (where bodybuilders became more massive than ever before) by the early 1990s, he ultimately modified that routine until there were fewer working sets and more days of rest. His first breakthrough became known as the 'Ideal (Principled) Routine', which was a fantastic step in minimal training. Outlined in High-Intensity Training the Mike Mentzer Way, fewer than five working sets were performed each session, and rest was emphasized, calling for 4–7 days of recovery before the next workout. According to Mentzer, biologists and physiologists since the nineteenth century have known that hypertrophy is directly related to intensity, not duration, of effort (Mentzer 2003;39). Most bodybuilding and weightlifting authorities do not take into account the severe nature of the stress imposed by heavy, strenuous resistance exercise carried to the point of positive muscular failure.

Mentzer's training courses (books and audio tapes), sold through bodybuilding magazines, were extremely popular, beginning after Mentzer won the 1978 IFBB Mr. Universe contest. This contest gathered a lot of attention, because at it he became the first bodybuilder ever to receive a perfect 300 score from the judges. Some time later, Mentzer attracted more attention when he introduced Dorian Yates to high-intensity training, and put him through his first series of workouts in the early '90s. Yates went on to win the Mr. Olympia six consecutive times, from 1992 to 1997.

Contest history
 1971 Mr. Lancaster – 1st
 1971 AAU Mr. America – 10th
 1971 AAU Teen Mr America – 2nd
 1975 IFBB Mr. America – 3rd (Medium)
 1975 ABBA Mr. USA –  2nd (Medium)
 1976 IFBB Mr. America – 1st (Overall)
 1976 IFBB Mr. America – 1st (Medium)
 1976 IFBB Mr. Universe – 2nd (MW)
 1977 IFBB North American Championships – 1st (Overall)
 1977 IFBB North American Championships – 1st (MW)
 1977 IFBB Mr. Universe – 2nd (HW)
 1978 IFBB USA vs the World – 1st (HW)
 1978 IFBB World Amateur Championships – 1st (HW)
1978 IFBB Mr. Universe - 1st 
 1979 IFBB Canada Pro Cup – 2nd
 1979 IFBB Florida Pro Invitational – 1st
 1979 IFBB Night of Champions – 3rd
 1979 IFBB Mr. Olympia – 1st (HW)
 1979 IFBB Pittsburgh Pro Invitational – 2nd
 1979 IFBB Southern Pro Cup – 1st
 1980 IFBB Mr. Olympia – 5th

Personal life

Atheism
Mentzer was an atheist, and stated in the last interview before his death that he did not believe in God, heaven, hell, or any kind of afterlife.

Objectivism
While in school, Mentzer's father motivated his academic performance by providing him with various kinds of inducements, from a baseball glove to hard cash. Years later, Mike said that his father "unwittingly ... was inculcating in me an appreciation of capitalism."

According to David M. Sears, a friend of Mentzer and an editor and publisher of his Muscles in Minutes book, he stated that:

Regarding what he learned from Ayn Rand, Mentzer said in an interview:

In his last interview before his death, Mentzer said he was delighted to get so many phone clients and close personal bodybuilding friends, such as Markus Reinhardt, who had been influenced by him to become Objectivists. He described Objectivism as the best philosophy ever devised. He also criticized the philosophy of Immanuel Kant, which he described as an "evil philosophy," because according to him Kant set out to destroy man's mind by undercutting his confidence in reason. He also criticized the teaching of Kantianism in schools and universities and said it's very difficult for an Objectivist philosopher with a PhD to get a job in any of the universities.

Final years and death
In the late '80s, Mentzer returned to training bodybuilders and writing for Iron Man magazine and spent much of the 1990s regaining his stature in the bodybuilding industry. Mike had met Dorian Yates in the 1980s and made an impression on Dorian's bodybuilding career. Years later when Yates won Joe Weider's "Mr. Olympia", he credited Mike's "Heavy Duty" principles for his training. Mike, his brother Ray, and Dorian formed a clothing company called "MYM" for Mentzer Yates Mentzer, also known as "Heavy Duty Inc", in 1994. MYM was based on the success of Don Smith's "CrazeeWear" bodybuilding apparel. The three principals wanted to capitalize on the physically fit lifestyle, which today has gone mainstream. With the blessing and promotion of Joe Weider, the trio manufactured and distributed their own line of cut-and-sew sportswear.

Mentzer died on June 10, 2001, in Rolling Hills, California. He was found dead in his apartment, due to heart complications, by his younger brother and fellow bodybuilder Ray Mentzer. Two days later, Ray died from complications from his long battle with Berger's disease.

See also
 List of male professional bodybuilders

References

External links
Khzokhlachev, Yegor. "Mike Mentzer Gallery". February 19, 2016. Retrieved November 9, 2016.

| colspan="3" style="text-align:center;"| Mr. Olympia

1951 births
2001 deaths
American people of German descent
American atheists
American bodybuilders
American atheist writers
Objectivists
People from Ephrata, Pennsylvania
Professional bodybuilders
Sportspeople from California
Sportspeople from Lancaster, Pennsylvania
Sportspeople from Los Angeles
Sportspeople from Los Angeles County, California
Sportspeople from Pennsylvania
People from Rolling Hills, California
Strength training writers
United States Air Force airmen
University of Maryland, College Park alumni